Originally, wild numbers are the numbers supposed to belong to a fictional sequence of numbers  imagined to exist in the mathematical world of the mathematical fiction The Wild Numbers authored by Philibert Schogt, a Dutch philosopher and mathematician. Even though Schogt has given a definition of the wild number sequence in his novel, it is couched in a deliberately imprecise language that the definition turns out to be no definition at all. However, the author claims that the first few members of the sequence are 11, 67, 2, 4769, 67. Later, inspired by this wild and erratic behaviour of the fictional wild numbers, American mathematician J. C. Lagarias used the terminology to describe a precisely defined sequence of integers which shows somewhat similar wild and erratic behaviour. Lagaria's wild numbers are connected with the Collatz conjecture and the concept of the 3x + 1 semigroup.  The original fictional sequence of wild numbers has found a place in the On-Line Encyclopedia of Integer Sequences.

The wild number problem
In the novel The Wild Numbers, The Wild Number Problem is formulated as follows:

Beauregard had defined a number of deceptively simple operations, which, when applied to a whole number, at first resulted in fractions. But if the same steps were repeated often enough, the eventual outcome was once again a whole number. Or, as Beauregard cheerfully observed: “In all numbers lurks a wild number, guaranteed to emerge when you provoke them long enough” . 0 yielded the wild number 11, 1 brought forth 67, 2 itself, 3 suddenly manifested itself as 4769, 4, surprisingly, brought forth 67 again. Beauregard himself had found fifty different wild numbers. The money prize was now awarded to whoever found a new one.

But it has not been specified what those "deceptively simple operations" are. Consequently, there is no way of knowing how those numbers 11, 67, etc. were obtained and no way of finding what the next wild number would be.

History of The Wild Number Problem
The novel The Wild Numbers has constructed a fictitious history for The Wild Number Problem. The important milestones in this history can be summarised as follows.

Real wild numbers
In mathematics, the multiplicative semigroup, denoted by W0, generated by the set  is called the Wooley semigroup in honour of the American mathematician Trevor D. Wooley. The multiplicative semigroup, denoted by W, generated by the set  is called the wild semigroup. The set of integers in W0 is itself a multiplicative semigroup. It is called the Wooley integer semigroup and members of this semigroup are called Wooley integers. Similarly, the set of integers in W is itself a multiplicative semigroup. It is called the wild integer semigroup and members of this semigroup are called wild numbers.

The wild numbers in OEIS

The On-Line Encyclopedia of Integer Sequences  (OEIS)  has an entry with the identifying number  relating to the wild numbers. According to OEIS, "apparently these are completely fictional and there is no mathematical explanation". However, the OEIS has some entries relating to pseudo-wild numbers carrying well-defined mathematical explanations.

Sequences of pseudo-wild numbers

Even though the sequence of wild numbers is entirely fictional, several mathematicians have tried to find rules that would generate the sequence of the fictional wild numbers. All these attempts have resulted in failures. However, in the process, certain new sequences of integers were created having similar wild and erratic behavior. These well-defined sequences are referred to as sequences of pseudo-wild numbers. A good example of this is the one discovered by the Dutch mathematician Floor van Lamoen. This sequence is defined as follows:

For a rational number p/q let 
.
For a positive integer n, the n-th pseudo-wild number is the number obtained by iterating f, starting at n/1, until an integer is reached, and if no integer is reached the pseudo-wild number is 0.

For example, taking n=2, we have

and so the second pseudo-wild number is 66. The first few pseudo-wild numbers are

 66, 66, 462, 180, 66, 31395, 714, 72, 9, 5.

References

Arithmetic
Integer sequences
Number theory